Taguig City University (TCU) is a Philippine local university. It was established in 2006 by the Sangguniang Bayan of the Municipal Government of Taguig. It is located in Gen. Santos Ave., Central Bicutan, Taguig City.

History
Pamantasan ng Lungsod ng Taguig (PLT), later renamed Taguig City University (TCU) upon conversion of the Municipality of Taguig to "cityhood" on 8 December 2004, was established through Ordinance No. 29, Series of 2004 (enacted 6 September 2004, Municipal Government of Taguig, authored by Councilor Aurelio Paulo R. Bartolome with councilors Marisse Balina-Eron and Allan Paul C. Cruz as co-sponsors).

Motivated by the urgency of need to serve the youth of growing Taguig City, the Local Government Administration came up with Ordinance No. 29 Series of 2004 "An Ordinance Establishing the Pamantasan ng Taguig and Appropriating Funds Thereof." This was an offshoot of the provisions of the Local Government Code.

Pamantasan ng Taguig was renamed Taguig City University pursuant to City Ordinance No.13, Series of 2009.

TCU has gone through development problems — top billed by the very basic need to have enough buildings. For two years, despite its courage, the university hardly manifested physical eloquence. In S.Y. 2006–2007, it swiftly took off: The organization of the university and construction of the TCU main building commenced. Meanwhile, undergraduate classes were held in high schools and elementary campuses in Taguig, lent to the growing management of TCU. In 2006, General Ricardo Papa Sr. Memorial High School offered some rooms for free. In 2007, rooms expanded to Taguig Elementary School, Sta. Ana-District 1 and Em's Elementary School, Signal Village-District 2. In 2008-2009 additional undergraduate classes were held in annex school of General Ricardo Papa Sr. Memorial High School at Brgy. Ususan and Signal Village Elementary School (Annex).

Lack of classrooms did not deter the holding of graduate school classes. The graduate program in Master of Arts in Teaching major in Mathematics, Filipino, English and Social Sciences were lumped together as a common major. It paved the way to the development of the Master of Arts in Educational Management, while holding classes in a secluded and secured room at Sunshine Mall Taguig.

School year 2009-2010 reflected the metamorphosis of youthful Taguig City University, because in June all classes from undergraduate to graduate programs started to be held at the new main building of TCU; the rest became part of history.

On TCU's first year of operation, 2006–2007, the university was under the stewardship of the vice president for Academic Affairs, Tess Umali. The organization of the university and construction of the TCU main building were the highlights of this period. In 2007–2010, the first TCU president was vice mayor George Elias. During his term the construction of the main building was completed and curricular offerings were expanded. Year 2010 to the early part of 2011, TCU was under the reigns of Bro. Rolando Dizon who became instrumental in creating four schools: Graduate Studies; Education, Arts and Sciences; Engineering, Technology and Computer Sciences; Management, Entrepreneurship, and Criminology.

On April 4, 2011, Mayor Ma. Laarni "Lani" L. Cayetano installed Atty. Lutgardo B. Barbo as the third president of TCU. He is a former governor of Eastern Samar and secretary of the Philippine Senate. He was president of the Philippine Normal University, 2006–2010.

At present, TCU has seven (7) colleges, namely, College of Arts and Sciences (CAS), College of Business Management (CBM), College of Criminal Justice (CCJ), College of Education (COE), College of Engineering and Technology (CET), College of Hospitality and Tourism Management (CHTM), and College of Information and Communication Technology (CICT) and Graduate School (GS).  

DEGREE PROGRAMS OFFERED:

Graduate School (GS)
1. Master in Business Administration (MBA)
2. Master in Public Administration (MPA)
3. Master of Science in Criminal Justice (MSCJ)
4. Master of Arts in Education (MAEd)
  
College of Arts and Sciences (CAS)
1. Bachelor of Science in Psychology (BSP)
2. Bachelor of Science in Social Work (BSSW)
3. Bachelor of Science in Public Administration (BSPA)

College of Business Management (CBM)
1. Bachelor of Science in Business Administration major in Marketing Management (BSBA-MM)
2. Bachelor of Science in Business Administration major in Human Resource Management (BSBA-HRM)
3. Bachelor of Science in Office Administration (BSOA)
4. Bachelor of Science in Entrepreneurship (BSE)

College of Criminal Justice (CCJ)
1. Bachelor of Science in Criminology (BS Crim)

College of Education (COE)
1. Bachelor of Secondary Education (BSEd) major in English
2. Bachelor of Secondary Education (BSEd) major in Mathematics
3. Bachelor of Secondary Education (BSEd) major in Science
4. Bachelor in Elementary Education (BEEd)
 
College of Engineering and Technology (CET)
1. Bachelor of Science in Industrial Engineering (BSIE)
2. Bachelor of Science in Industrial Technology major in Electrical
3. Bachelor of Science in Industrial Technology major in Electronics
4. Bachelor of Science in Civil Engineering Major in Structural Engineering 
5. Bachelor of Science in Civil Engineering Major in Transportation Engineering 
6. Bachelor of Science in Mechanical Engineering

College of Hospitality and Tourism Management (CHTM)
1. Bachelor of Science in Hospitality Management (BSHM)
2. Bachelor of Science in Tourism Management (BSTM)

College of Information and Communication Technology (CICT)
1. Bachelor of Science in Computer Science (BSCS)
2. Bachelor of Science in Information System (BSIS)

External links

Education in Taguig
Educational institutions established in 2000
Local colleges and universities in Metro Manila
2000 establishments in the Philippines